Plasmodium icipeensis is a parasite of the genus Plasmodium.

Like all Plasmodium species P. achiotense has both vertebrate and insect hosts. The vertebrate hosts for this parasite are lizards.

Geographical occurrence 
This species is found in Kenya.

References 

icipeensis